The Sanremo Music Festival 2003 was the 53rd annual Sanremo Music Festival, held at the Teatro Ariston in Sanremo, province of Imperia, between 5 and 9 March 2003 and broadcast by Rai 1.

The show was presented by Pippo Baudo, assisted by Serena Autieri and Claudia Gerini. Baudo also served as the artistic director of the Festival.

The winner of the Big Artists section was Alexia with the song "Per dire di no". Sergio Cammariere won the Mia Martini Critics Award with the song "Tutto quello che un uomo".

Dolcenera won the "Newcomers" section with the song "Siamo tutti là fuori". 

in addition to musical guests, the guests of this edition also included Sharon Stone, Mike Bongiorno, Valentino Rossi, Mario Cipollini, Enrico Montesano, Nino Frassica, Giorgio Panariello, Lino Banfi, Massimo Ghini. Nilla Pizzi received a career award and performed her hits "Vola colomba" and "Grazie dei fior".

Participants and results

Big Artists

Newcomers

Musical guests

References 

Sanremo Music Festival by year
2003 in Italian music
2003 music festivals
2003 in Italian television